GSL class of power barge are series of four yardcrafts built by Goa Shipyard Limited for Indian Navy.

References

Auxiliary ships of the Indian Navy